Bascom is an unincorporated community in Smith County, located in the U.S. state of Texas, settled in 1846 on the site of an Indian encampment and flowing spring. The community was named after the Christian preacher and circuit rider Henry Bidleman Bascom.

Notes

External links
Bascom, TX in the Handbook of Texas

Unincorporated communities in Smith County, Texas
Unincorporated communities in Texas